Uromacer oxyrhynchus, the pointed snake, is a species of snake of the family Colubridae endemic to the Caribbean island of Hispaniola (in Haiti and the Dominican Republic).

References 

Reptiles described in 1854
Taxa named by André Marie Constant Duméril
Taxa named by Gabriel Bibron
Taxa named by Auguste Duméril
Reptiles of Haiti
Reptiles of the Dominican Republic
Endemic fauna of Hispaniola